Inape cateres is a species of moth of the family Tortricidae that is endemic to Ecuador, especially in Azuay Province.

References

External links

Moths described in 2006
Endemic fauna of Ecuador
cateres
Moths of South America
Taxa named by Józef Razowski